International Standard Number may refer to:
International Standard Book Number, a unique numeric commercial book identifier based upon the 9-digit Standard Book Numbering code
International Standard Serial Number, a unique eight-digit number used to identify a print or electronic periodical publication
International Standard Name Identifier, a unique sixteen-digit number used to identify the public identities of contributors to media content 
International Standard Music Number, a thirteen-character alphanumeric identifier for printed music
International Standard Audiovisual Number, a unique identifier for audiovisual works and related versions
ISWN, the abbreviation of International Standard Wine Number, a coding scheme intended to give a unique identifier for each wine worldwide